Sharman Joshi (born 28 April 1979) is an Indian actor and television presenter who predominantly works in Hindi movies, known for his roles in films like Rang De Basanti (2006), Golmaal (2006), Dhol (2007) and 3 Idiots (2009).

Early life
Joshi belongs to a Gujarati Brahmin family of actors and performing artists. His father, Arvind Joshi, was a veteran of Gujarati theatre, while his aunt Sarita Joshi (Bhosle) and cousins acted in Marathi and Gujarati theatre. His sister is actress Manasi Joshi Roy and brother-in-law is actor Rohit Roy.

Personal life
Joshi married Prerana Chopra, daughter of actor Prem Chopra, on 15 June 2000 at the age of 21. The couple have three children, Khyana Joshi, and twins Vaaryan and Vihaan Joshi.

Career

Theatre 
Joshi has acted, produced and directed stage plays in English, Hindi, Marathi and Gujarati languages. He  directed and starred in various theatre performances. He appeared as a deaf character in Gujarati version of popular play All the Best, which did over 550 shows in three years.
Another one of his popular comedy play was "Ame Layi Gaya, Tame Rahi Gaya" where he played four different roles. In 2016, he made his directorial debut with the Hindi rom-com, Main Aur Tum. It features him in the lead role along with Tejashree Pradhan.

Movies 
He made his film debut in the 1999 art film, Godmother. This was followed by Style (2001), produced by N Chandra. Style was followed by its sequel Xcuse Me (2003) and other comedies such as Shaadi No. 1 (2005). In 2006, he starred in Rang De Basanti. Later that year he starred in the comedy film Golmaal. In 2007 he appeared in Life in a... Metro, Dhol, and Raqeeb. The following year saw him as the character Shyam in Hello, the film adaptation of Chetan Bhagat's novel One Night @ the Call Center. Joshi played the male lead in Sorry Bhai! in 2008 and one of the three characters (Raju Rastogi) in the 2009 film 3 Idiots, which was based on Chetan Bhagat's novel Five Point Someone. He also played a lead role in family drama Ferrari ki Sawaari (2012). He also played the role of a cop in the erotic-thriller Wajah Tum Ho. He has played a lead role in the Bollywood movies Kaashi in Search of Ganga (2018) and 3 Storeys. He is best known for his role as Raju Rastogi in the movie 3 Idiots. He made his digital debut with Balaji Telefilms's production Baarish in 2019 as the male lead opposite to Asha Negi.

Other 
In 2009, he hosted a game show at Real T.V. called PokerFace: Dil Sachcha Chehra Jhootha, which was based on a British game show called PokerFace. He has been honored with the life membership of International Film and Television Club of Asian Academy of Film & Television. Sharman refers to be type-cast during his career and spoke about it at a TEDx conference in Mumbai in January, 2017.

Filmography

Playback singer

Television & Web Series

Awards and nominations

References

External links

 
 Sharman Joshi official website

Indian male film actors
Living people
Male actors in Hindi cinema
Indian male stage actors
1969 births
Male actors from Mumbai
Indian game show hosts
Gujarati people
International Indian Film Academy Awards winners